Collinsia torreyi is a species of flowering plant in the plantain family known by the common name Torrey's blue-eyed Mary. It is native to California and adjacent sections of Oregon and Nevada, where it grows in the coniferous forests of several mountain ranges, including the Sierra Nevada.

This is an annual herb producing a slender, reddish stem up to about 25 centimeters tall. The inflorescence is a densely glandular array of flowers arising on pedicels. The corolla is no more than a centimeter long and two white or lavender-tinted upper lobes and three darker lavender to purple lower lobes.

There are several varieties:
C. t. var. brevicarinata - known from the Sierra Nevada and San Gabriel Mountains of California
C. t. var. latifolia - known from northern California and southern Oregon
C. t. var. torreyi - known from California and western Nevada
C. t. var. wrightii (syn. Collinsia wrightii), limited to California and western Nevada

External links
Jepson Manual Treatment
USDA Plants Profile
Photo gallery

torreyi
Flora of California
Flora of Nevada
Flora of Oregon
Flora of the Cascade Range
Flora of the Great Basin
Flora of the Klamath Mountains
Flora of the Sierra Nevada (United States)
Natural history of the Transverse Ranges
Plants described in 1868
Flora without expected TNC conservation status